Shredderman Rules is a 2007 American television teen film based on Wendelin Van Draanen's Shredderman book series. The film stars Devon Werkheiser, and was originally aired on Nickelodeon with the final episode of Ned's Declassified School Survival Guide, which also starred Werkheiser. It is the first film to be aired under the banner Nickelodeon Original Movie.

Plot
Nolan Byrd, a shy but tech-savvy eighth grader, is assigned a multimedia project by his teacher, Mr. Green. Nolan decides to do an exposé on schoolmate Bubba Bixby, who bullies him and many other students.

Taking the pseudonym "Shredderman" to avoid Bubba's retaliation, Nolan films Bubba bullying other students and uploads the footage to a website, www.shreddermanrules.com, causing Bubba to face discipline from the principal, Dr. Voss. Nolan later begins filming the school's faculty, including Dr. Voss, and they too are exposed for similarly cruel actions.

Nolan discovers that Bubba's father, Bob, the CEO of a waste management company whom Dr. Voss is close with, is planning to dump sewage in a local pond under the guise of an urban renewal project. Nolan posts the evidence online, and word spreads quickly, inspiring Nolan to sabotage the signing of the deed. Nolan's father, a local journalist, begins investigating the project.

In retaliation, Bob and Bubba attempt to discredit Shredderman by framing him. They steal a guinea pig named Claudette from Nolan's crush, Isabel, but Nolan is able to retrieve her from the pet shop.

On the day of the signing, Nolan manages to expose Bob using a toy boat and two pairs of planes, despite Dr. Voss' attempts to stop him. Bob is arrested and sentenced to community service at the school, while a humiliated Dr. Voss is fired. Nolan's father, after the successful publication of his story, heads to Britain for a bigger story. Shredderman becomes famous, though Nolan continues to conceal his identity and successfully asks Isabel out on a date.

Cast
 Devon Werkheiser as Nolan Byrd/"Shredderman"
 Cajun Moon Holland as young Nolan
 Tim Meadows as Mr. Green
 Andrew Caldwell as Alvin "Bubba" Bixby
 Daniel Roebuck as Bob Bixby
 Mindy Sterling as Dr. Sheila Voss
 Dave Coulier as Steven Byrd
 Clare Carey as Mrs. Byrd
 Francia Almendárez as Isabel Lopez
 Sarah Mendez as young Isabel
 Kendré Berry as Max Smith
 T.J. Burnett as young Max
 Marisa Guterman as "Man-Hands" Miriam
 Curtis Armstrong as Mayor Izzo
 Julianna McCarthy as Grandma
 Henry E. Taylor III as Art the Fart
 Alexandra Krosney as Tina Atkins
 Justin Lee as Todd
 Chad Smathers as Randy

Soundtrack
Paul Doucette – "Better Days"
Smash Mouth – "Walkin' on the Sun"

Home media
The film was released on DVD on August 28, 2007, along with The Last Day of Summer.

References

External links
 
 

2007 television films
2007 films
2000s teen comedy films
Nickelodeon original films
American teen comedy films
Films based on children's books
Films directed by Savage Steve Holland
Films about educators
Films about bullying
Malware in fiction
2000s English-language films
2000s American films